Loalwa Braz Vieira (3 June 1953 – 19 January 2017) was a Brazilian vocalist and musician, best known for providing the lead vocals for the French-Brazilian recording act Kaoma for their 1989 cover of the hit "" (by Ulysses Hermosa, lead singer of the popular Bolivian folk group Los Kjarkas), later renamed as "Lambada". She was fluent in four languages, and recorded songs in her native Portuguese, as well as in Spanish, French and English.

Biography
Braz was born in Jacarepaguá, Rio de Janeiro, to a family of musicians: her father was an orchestra leader and her mother was a popular and classical pianist. Braz learned to play the piano at the age of four, and started singing at the age of 13. She lived in Paris from 1985, and in Geneva from 2010 until her death in 2017.

Braz grew up surrounded by the rhythms of Brazil, which shone through her songs. Her natural gifts were strengthened by hard work. Braz quickly obtained many awards, and started performing at Rio’s most prestigious night clubs. Her talent gained her the recognition of Brazil’s greatest pop artists Gilberto Gil, Tim Maia, Alcione, Maria Bethânia, Emílio Santiago, Gal Costa, and Caetano Veloso, who became her stage and recording co-workers from 1975 to 1985. She moved to Paris in 1985, after her success at the Palais des Sports, with the show “Brésil en Fête”.

Braz appeared at major show business venues: Paradis Latin, Méridien (Paris), Olympia ('88 and '92), TLP Dejazet, New Morning, Zenith, Madison Square Garden (New York City), and the London Palladium and Waldorf Astoria (both London). In 1989, Braz provided vocals for the song “Lambada”, recorded by Kaoma, which became a worldwide hit but was originally composed by Ulysses Hermosa, leader of the popular Bolivian folk group 'Los Kjarkas' and used without his permission; a settlement for an undisclosed sum was later reached. The success of “Lambada” also brought new attention to Latin music in non-Latin regions.

Braz composed and sang two songs for the sound-track of the movie Le Roi Desperados – produced by French television station Canal+ - and performed with the London Philharmonic Orchestra, in Abbey Road, for the sound-track of the French movie Dis-Moi Oui, directed by Alexandre Arcady and with music by Phillipe Sarde. Many songs marked her career: “Chorando Se Foi” (“Lambada”), “Tago Mago”, “Dançando Lambada”, “Mélodie D’Amour” and “La Media Noche”. Braz's adaptation of the Stevie Wonder song “Another Star” into Portuguese (as “Outro Lugar”) demonstrated her skills, and that was why great names of world music were interested in her compositions and arrangements.

Braz was a member of the Arts, Sciences and Literature French Academy; she was decorated with the silver medal (Prix Thorlet) in 2003. She released a solo album in 2006, itself a trip between romanticism and the explosion of rhythms which characterized the artist's musical style. A new title enriched the singer's career: Ambassadress of the Association Francophone pour la Promotion de l'Esprit Sportif (AFPES).

Death
In the early hours of 19 January 2017, police found Braz's body in a burnt-out car next to a road in Saquarema, 73 km from Rio de Janeiro. She was 63 years old. According to witnesses, two men had been seen earlier in her home, not far from the place where the vehicle was found. Police detained three men as suspects in her death, describing the crime as 'a robbery gone awry'. According to police investigation, she was murdered by one of her employees, who had started working at the singer's inn just 15 days prior to her death.

Discography
 Solo
 Brésil (1989)
 Recomeçar (2003)
 Ensolarado (2011)
 with Kaoma
 Worldbeat (1989)
 Tribal-Pursuit (1991)
 A La Media Noche (1998)

References

External links
 Official website

1953 births
2017 deaths
Brazilian dance musicians
Musicians from Rio de Janeiro (city)
People murdered in Brazil
Brazilian murder victims
Afro-Brazilian women singers
20th-century Brazilian women singers
20th-century Brazilian singers
21st-century Brazilian women singers
21st-century Brazilian singers
People from Saquarema